The Tatra 138 was a truck produced in Czechoslovakia by the Tatra company.
The immediate successor to the Tatra 111, the model introduced a number of new features while continuing the evolution of Tatra concept. The truck was produced from 1959 to 1971.

History
The decision to replace the Tatra 111 was made in 1952 as part of a central state planning economy, where Tatra Kopřivnice was to produce 7-10 ton utility trucks. In 1956 at II. Czechoslovak Machinery Expo in Brno, Tatra exhibited 2 new models, the T137 and T138. Both vehicles  had up to 70% of parts in common across the range. New design features were introduced, such as improvement in driver environment and usability  e.g. hydraulic power steering, a compressed air assisted clutch and electro-pneumatic auxiliary gearbox gear selection.

Design and technology
The design was of central backbone tube construction with modular power train concept in 4×4, 4×2, 6×6, 6×4 and 6×2 configuration. Version 4×2, 6×4, and 6×2 were produced in very low quantity. The main advantages of central load carrying backbone tube are in its high torsion and bend strength protecting truck body against load stresses. The secondary advantage is that it houses all important parts of the drive train. In addition, it enables a concept of modular construction where designers and customers can specify 4, 6, wheel drive and various length and wheelbase combinations.

Engine

The engine was located ahead of  the front axle. It featured an air-cooled V8 75° with dry sump design and a new featured thermostat controlled cooling fan by engine oil temperature via hydraulic clutch drive to reduce noise and fuel consumption. The engine was also used in the OT-64 APC.

Chassis
Central backbone tube, front and rear axles with independent swing half axles. The front suspension by torque arms (torsion bars) and hydraulic shock absorbers. The rear suspension by longitudinal half elliptic leaf springs. Front axle drive selectable on demand,  differential  locks  electro-pneumatically controlled via dash switches.
Front track = 
Rear track = 
Wheelbase = model specific
Tatra T138 6×6 PP2, P3, PP6 = +
  Tatra  T138 6×6 PR14, PPR S3, PR S1, P19 = +
 Tatra T138 4×4 = 
Ground clearance =

Transmission
 Main gearbox - 5+1  (2-5 gear synchronized)
Auxiliary gearbox - 2 speed  (half split electro-pneumatic control)
Step down transfer case
 Clutch - 2x plate dry

Brakes
 Main wheel brakes   ---->   dual circuit full air drum brakes
 Park brake   ---->   mechanical via output shaft at the back of the gearbox
 Supplementary brake ---->    exhaust brake electro-pneumatically controlled

Bodywork

All steel cab construction with various body builder equipment such as tippers, flatbeds, concrete mixers, tankers, cranes, excavators and firefighting.

Production
Total production  exceeded  45,900.
The Tatra T138 was exported to the USSR, Bulgaria, Romania, Poland, France, Austria, Yugoslavia and the Netherlands
Primary variants:
 T138 S1 -  one-way tipper
 T138 S3 -  three-way tipper
 T138 V,VN - civilian and military flatbed
 T138 P1V  -  military special
 T138 CAS - firefighting unit
 T138 PP6V - excavator
 T138 PP5, PP4V, PP7 - tanker
 T138 P3, P11, P18, PP2, PP5, PP6, PP7, PP8V - crane
 T138 PP7 - concrete mixer

External links

Tatra a.s.
Tatra Portal

T138
Cars of the Czech Republic
All-wheel-drive vehicles
Trucks of the Czech Republic
Vehicles introduced in 1959